Communauté d'agglomération du Pays de Dreux is an intercommunal structure, centred on the city of Dreux. It is located in the Eure-et-Loir and Eure departments, in the Centre-Val de Loire and Normandy regions, northern France. It was created in January 2014. Its seat is in Dreux. Its area is 1055.7 km2. Its population was 115,181 in 2017, of which 31,044 in Dreux proper.

Composition
The communauté d'agglomération consists of the following 81 communes, of which 6 in the Eure department:

Abondant
Allainville
Anet
Ardelles
Aunay-sous-Crécy
Beauche
Berchères-sur-Vesgre
Bérou-la-Mulotière
Boissy-en-Drouais
Boncourt
Le Boullay-les-Deux-Églises
Le Boullay-Mivoye
Le Boullay-Thierry
Brezolles
Broué
Bû
La Chapelle-Forainvilliers
Charpont
Châtaincourt
Châteauneuf-en-Thymerais
Les Châtelets
La Chaussée-d'Ivry
Cherisy
Crécy-Couvé
Crucey-Villages
Dampierre-sur-Avre
Dreux
Écluzelles
Escorpain
Ézy-sur-Eure
Favières
Fessanvilliers-Mattanvilliers
Fontaine-les-Ribouts
Garancières-en-Drouais
Garnay
Germainville
Gilles
Guainville
Ivry-la-Bataille
Laons
Louvilliers-en-Drouais
Louye
Luray
La Madeleine-de-Nonancourt
Maillebois
La Mancelière
Marchezais
Marville-Moutiers-Brûlé
Le Mesnil-Simon
Mézières-en-Drouais
Montreuil
Nonancourt
Ormoy
Ouerre
Oulins
Prudemanche
Puiseux
Revercourt
Rouvres
Rueil-la-Gadelière
Saint-Ange-et-Torçay
Sainte-Gemme-Moronval
Saint-Georges-Motel
Saint-Jean-de-Rebervilliers
Saint-Lubin-de-Cravant
Saint-Lubin-des-Joncherets
Saint-Maixme-Hauterive
Saint-Ouen-Marchefroy
Saint-Rémy-sur-Avre
Saint-Sauveur-Marville
Saulnières
Saussay
Serazereux
Serville
Sorel-Moussel
Thimert-Gâtelles
Tremblay-les-Villages
Tréon
Vernouillet
Vert-en-Drouais
Villemeux-sur-Eure

References

Dreux
Dreux
Dreux